Rytíři Grálu is a 1996 Czech adventure video game.

Production 
The game was the first Czech attempt at the dungeon crawler video game format. Root.cz asserted that it was the first serious Czech video gaming project to be successful in terms of commercial sales.

Plot and gameplay
The narrative is based on the story of Excalibur. In this game, Arthur returns without his sword and "gets sick".

A certain combination of keys will cause the destruction of enemies.

Critical reception
Bonusweb.cz noted its dark atmosphere and the amount of empty screens between important locations, adding that the title failed to live up to its potential. Root.cz felt the game's graphics were not great but understandable due to the limitations of the local Czech resources at the time.

References

External links
 PC Engine preview
 Excalibur review
 Level review
 Score review
 Score article

1996 video games
DOS games
DOS-only games
Dungeon crawler video games
Europe-exclusive video games
Role-playing video games
Video games developed in the Czech Republic
Vochozka Trading games